Fritz Ludwig Otto Wichgraf (born 9 May 1853) was a German entomologist.

Wichgraf's Lepidoptera collection was purchased by James John Joicey. His collections of Acraea, Lasiocampidae and Bombycidae are in the Natural History Museum, London.

Wichgraf, F. (1909) Beschreibung neuer Formen der Gattung Acraea F. aus Rhodesia, Mashunaland und Angola. Berliner Entomologische Zeitschrift 53:240-247.   
Wichgraf, F. (1911) Einige neue afrikanische Lepidopteren. Internationale Entomologische Zeitschrift 5:173-175.   
Wichgraf, F. (1913) Eine neue athiopische Limacodide und anders. Internationale Entomologische Zeitschrift 7:9-10; 13-14; 21-22.   
Wichgraf, F. (1914) Neues aus der afrikanischen Lepidopteren-Fauna. Deutsche Entomologische Zeitung 1914:345-353.   
Wichgraf, F. (1918) Neue afrikanische Lepidopteren. Internationale Entomologische Zeitschrift 12:26-30.   
Wichgraf, F. (1921) Neue afrikanische Lepidopteren aus der Ertlschen Sammlung. Internationale Entomologische Zeitschrift 14:171-172; 179-180; 195-197.  
 Berl. ent. Z. online.

References

Hesselbart, G., Oorschot, H. van and Wagener, S., 1995 Die Tagfalter der Türkei unter Berücksichtigung der angrenzenden Länder. - Bocholt, Selbstverlag S. Wagener 1-3 : 1-754; 758-1354; 1-847, 141 Taf.(z.T. farbig); 342 Karten

German lepidopterists
1853 births
Year of death missing